Walter Anstead was an English first-class cricketer who played six matches for Surrey between 1870 and 1872.  A right arm fast bowler, he was highly successful in the handful of games he appeared in, taking an impressive 48 wickets at just 11.29 with a strike rate of a wicket every 28.77 balls.  His best bowling, of 6 for 27, came against Lancashire at the Oval on his debut in 1870, a performance which helped Surrey to an innings victory, while a week later he took 11 wickets in the game against Sussex, helping his team to a victory by just 14 runs.  After four games in August 1870 he reappeared only once in 1871 and 1872.  His brother Thomas Anstead was a notable player in club cricket while his son Rudolph Anstead played a first-class match in India in 1921/22.

English cricketers
Surrey cricketers
1845 births
1933 deaths